A statue of James Meredith stands on the campus of the University of Mississippi in Oxford, Mississippi, United States. The statue honors Meredith, a civil rights activist who integrated the university in 1962. The statue was dedicated in 2006 and is located near a portal, which collectively make up the Civil Rights Monument.

History

Background 
James Meredith was a civil rights activist who enrolled at the University of Mississippi in 1962, becoming the first African American student at the university. However, his enrollment was opposed by proponents of racial segregation, with this opposition escalating into the Ole Miss riot of 1962, which led to two deaths and numerous injuries. While state officials tried to prevent Meredith from attending the university, United States President John F. Kennedy ordered federal authorities to escort him onto the university's campus. Meredith was officially enrolled and the university integrated on October 1, 1962.

Dedication 
This statue honoring Meredith was dedicated on the 44th anniversary of the integration of the university, on October 1, 2006. Approximately 1,500 people attended the ceremony, which featured a keynote speech from U.S. Representative John Lewis, who said, "With the unveiling of this monument, we free ourselves from the chains of a difficult past. Today we can celebrate a new day, a new beginning, the birth of a new South and a new America that is more free, more fair and more just than ever before." Other speakers at the event included U.S. Representative Roger Wicker, Chancellor Robert Khayat, actor Morgan Freeman, and James's son Joseph Meredith. James, while attending the event, was not a speaker. The cost of the total monument, which also includes a nearby portal, cost $160,000, which was raised through grants and donations.

A 2018 article in The Daily Mississippian claims that Meredith was opposed to the statue from the time of its erection, arguing that both that statue and the Confederate Monument on the campus should be removed. However, after attending the 2018 Black Alumni Reunion, his position on the statue has changed.

Vandalism 
In the early morning of February 16, 2014, the statue was vandalized, with a noose placed around the statue's neck and an old state flag of Georgia (which features a Confederate battle flag) draped across the figure. The incident was first reported by a construction worker who reported hearing two men shouting racial slurs. The following day, the alumni association offered a $25,000 reward to anyone who could provide information on the identity of the two men, while the campus police asked the Federal Bureau of Investigation for help with the investigation. By the following week, police had pressed charges against two 19-year-old students from Georgia, with a third student considered "prominent in the investigation". Following the charges, the fraternity that the three students belonged to, Sigma Phi Epsilon, was suspended by the university and an investigation into reports of other issues at the fraternity, including underage drinking and hazing, was launched by the university. In April, the University of Mississippi chapter of that fraternity was shut down.

Design 

Meredith is wearing a suit and has a light mustache. A plaque located in front of the statue bears the following inscription:

See also 
 2006 in art

References

Further reading

External links 

 

2006 establishments in Mississippi
2006 sculptures
Bronze sculptures in the United States
Monuments and memorials in Mississippi
Monuments and memorials of the civil rights movement
Outdoor sculptures in Mississippi
Buildings and structures at the University of Mississippi
Vandalized works of art in Mississippi